Interbol is an international space project under the leadership of the Russian Space Agency and the Space Research Institute of the Russian Academy of Sciences. The list of participants includes the Institute of Atmospheric Research of the Czech Academy of Sciences,  NASA,  European Space Agency, Japan Aerospace Exploration Agency, and the Canadian Space Agency. The goal of the project is to study the correlations between plasma processes in the tail of the magnetosphere and in the Van Allen radiation belt (auroral particles acceleration region) with a high time-space resolution. Two space probes have been launched into high-altitude elliptical orbits:

auroral probe was launched August 29, 1996 into orbit with  an apogee of  20 000 km. The probe was sent to space in the same month as the FAST spacecraft, which studies aurora at both poles;
tail probe was launched  August 3, 1995 into orbit with  an apogee of  200 000 km;

Both orbits are almost parallel to the ecliptic. Each probe consists of a pair satellite-subsatellite. Subsatellites “Magion-4” (auroral) and “Magion-5” (tail) were procured by the Institute of atmospheric Research of the Czech Academy of Sciences.  The communication with “Magion-5” was interrupted August 30, 1996 and was restored May 7, 1998. The life expectancy of space vehicles is 12 years.

Related projects 
GEOTAIL,  WIND, POLAR, SOHO, FAST,  RELICT-1, RELICT-2

References

Space Research Institute of the Russian Academy of Sciences

Satellites of Russia
Satellites orbiting Earth
1995 in spaceflight
1996 in spaceflight
Weather satellites of Russia